is a Japanese light novel series written by Hisashi Suzuki and illustrated by Lunalia. Twelve volumes have been published by Media Factory since November 25, 2011 under their MF Bunko J label. A manga adaptation by You Ibuki started serialization in the manga magazine Monthly Comic Gene on April 15, 2013 and Kadokawa made the English digital volumes available on BookWalker on October 29, 2015. A 12-episode anime television series adaptation by Madhouse originally aired between January 9 and March 27, 2014.

Plot
Takeshi Nanase is an ordinary high school student who has a somewhat dark and troubled past. On his way to kendo practice, he comes across a girl named Mui Aiba in a school uniform he never saw before. After being nursed back to health by Takeshi, instead of thanking him, she accidentally turns him into a magician.

Takeshi learns that the current world is actually split into two - the world that he's living in, and the world of magicians. He also learns that Mui is a magician enrolled in the Subaru Magic Academy, where many magicians can learn to control their powers and live in peace with regular humans. Instead of returning to the real world, Takeshi and his new magician friends Kurumi Isoshima and Kazumi Ida decide to enroll into the academy as well.

These three friends are fighting for different reasons, either to escape their turbulent past or to catch up to the future. They possess different abilities which they must learn to harness in order to fend off the Ghost Trailers, a group of magicians who are resorting to using violence to assert their superiority over humans. Takeshi and his friends must strive to become stronger and must face the Ghost Trailers' leader in order to prevent the Second Great Magic War from taking place.

Characters

Main characters

The male protagonist. A high school freshman, he is talented in kendo with a serious personality. Takeshi has a cold relationship with his family and pretends to be in a relationship with his childhood friend Kurumi. This relationship is one of the main sources of conflict between him and his younger brother, Gekkō. Since the beginning of middle school, he has chosen not to call Kurumi by her first name, instead referring to her "Isoshima-san", which is considered to be too polite for people who have known each other as long as they have. Takeshi became a magician after Mui unintentionally exposed him to magic shortly after they first met. Rather than return to the Real World with their magic sealed away permanently, he, along with Kurumi and Ida, chooses to become a magician and enrolls in Subaru Magic Academy. His magic is Evasive-type and his Aspect (the tool that acts as a focus through which magicians project their power) is a type of gun sword with the approximate length and weight of a kendo sword, that was named "Twilight" by its previous owner, one of the 15 'Great Magicians'. He loses his sword after the first fight with Gekkō. He appears to feel a great deal of affection for Kurumi, although not to the same extent as she does for him, and seems to be marginally aware of Mui's feelings for him, and recalled the promise about breaking off the fake relationship with Kurumi if they ever found a person they truly love while staring directly at Mui.

One of the female protagonists. A magician who was found by Takeshi when she collapsed on the school grounds, and unintentionally turned him into magician by exposing him to magic. She uses Acceleration magic and is trying to release her older brother from Trailer's influence. When Takeshi and his friends enroll in Subaru Magic Academy, Mui is transferred to Class C as punishment, even though she is S-class in both theory and practical magic. Her Aspect is a gun she named "Arthur" and has had feelings for Takeshi ever since they kissed in the school infirmary.

The other female protagonist. Kurumi is Takeshi's childhood friend and his fake girlfriend. She became a magician during the confrontation between Takeshi and the magicians from Trailer and gained Transformation magic. Her Aspect is a lipstick.
She is a beautiful girl and has been admired ever since she was young. From the time she entered middle school she was confessed to by numerous boys including, disturbingly, university students. After a traumatizing experience with a stalker, she asked Takeshi, whom she considered to be the only boy she could trust, to pretend to be her boyfriend to keep other boys away from her. This arrangement was to last until either of them found someone they truly love. Despite pretending to be in a relationship with Takeshi, she has genuine feelings for him and wishes to become a real couple.
As the story progresses, her traumatic past involving Takeshi and Gekkō, her complex relationship with them, and the affections Takeshi, Gekkō, and Takao Oigami all harbor toward her serve to move the plot forward. Kurumi later becomes Takeshi's reason for developing his abilities so that he can fight all-out against Gekkō. Kazuma Ryuusenji, Trailer's leader, entrusts her with important truths.

Takeshi's friend, who appears to be and acts like a punk with bleached spiky hair, earrings, and skull ring. He is actually softhearted, very carefree, and has a sister complex toward his little sister. He became a magician in the same confrontation as Kurumi and gained Destruction magic, which allows him to produce flames. His Aspect is a ring.

Subaru Magic Academy

A girl who is the headmistress and director of the Academy.

Takeshi and friends' homeroom teacher.

The school nurse, who idolizes Momoka Shijō.

The Academy's weapons provider.

A corrupt English teacher at the Academy who occasionally tells fortunes. During one of these readings the fortune she tells Kurumi leads to her developing doubts about Takeshi. Violet is revealed to be a member of Trailer, having killed an entire party of magicians from Wizard Brace to keep her identity secret. Kippei refers to her as 'V' and appears to be wary of her magical strength. Her position as a teacher and her fortune telling sideshow allow her to gather information, influence students to either act as Trailer wishes (e.g. by giving out false information, leading them into traps etc.) or join Trailer or to become more susceptible to being influenced by Trailer.

Ghost Trailer

Takeshi's younger brother and the main antagonist. He used to be a cheerful and friendly person who got along well with his brother. Both of them practiced kendo and were childhood friends with Kurumi, whom Gekkō was obsessed with. The brothers' relationship soured after Gekkō confronted Takeshi about his new 'relationship' with Kurumi, accusing him of taking advantage of her vulnerable state after the stalker incident. When Takeshi ran after his brother to explain the situation, Gekkō was hit by a car. The accident caused lasting damage to Gekkō's leg and forced him to quit kendo, the one thing he was better at than his older brother. Gekkō's resentment of his brother over Kurumi changed into hatred because he blames his brother for stealing everything from him (first Kurumi, then kendo) and later, after years of mental abuse, "running away" to a new school (Subaru Magic Academy). Gekkō follows Takeshi to Subaru Magic Academy, to his older brother's and Kurumi's surprise, and turns out to be a magician capable of casting very powerful and destructive magic. He became a magician through the intervention of Washizu. During Trailers' attack on the Academy it is revealed that he has a vindictive personality (and has always believed himself to be superior to his brother) and desires above all else to hurt Takeshi and take away everything that he holds dear. Gekkō although loses to Takeshi after the second fight in their hometown and the Gun Sword "Twilight" returns to Takeshi.

Mui's older brother, whose memories were erased by Ghost Trailers. He is hunting Mui because he has been tasked with bringing her to Ghost Trailers, which is why she fled to the Real World, where she ran into Takeshi and his friends.

A member of Trailer who has the same kind of Evasive magic as Takeshi. After he and Hotaru were knocked out, they were detained by Subaru Magic Academy. He later forms a close bond with Kurumi, and even calls her by her first name, to the ire of Takeshi (who continues to call her "Isoshima-san").

A female member of Trailer who is often mistaken for a boy, and Oigami's close friend. She was knocked out by Ida and then, together with Takao, detained by Subaru Magic Academy.

A member of Trailer who lost his magic after he rashly attacked Mui and Kurumi with magic while in the Real World.

He suddenly appears in front of Takeshi and his friends after their battle with Tsuganashi Aiba.

The leader of Ghost Trailer who believes that magicians are superior to normal humans. He has been missing, and hoped to be dead, since he cast the spell 'Last Requiem' during the Great Magic War that took place 16-17 years before the present. He is then revealed to be Takeshi from another timeline that had failed to change the future over and over resulting in an endless paradox of events due to Gekkō coming back to life as Kazuma starting the 1st War over and over.

Others

Ida's beloved little sister who has reached her rebellious age. Takeshi once saved her from a couple of thugs who were harassing her - something that Ida, who was late arriving on the scene, has never forgotten. She enrolls in the elementary school division of Subaru Magic Academy after an incident between her and Ida during spring break turns her into a magician.

Takeshi and Gekkō's mother. She has been cold to Takeshi ever since Gekkō's accident. She is keeping secrets about herself and her sons. Yōko was at one time a teacher at Subaru Academy and is one of the 15 "Great Magicians" from Wizard Brace, a community of magicians who believe in peaceful coexistence with normal humans, who split the world in two to prevent 'Last Requiem' from killing all non-magicians.

Media

Light novels
The first light novel was published on November 25, 2011 by Media Factory under their MF Bunko J imprint. Twelve volumes have been published as of September 25, 2015. (October 2013 merger of companies led to new ISBNs)

Manga
A manga adaptation by You Ibuki started serialization in the manga magazine Monthly Comic Gene on April 15, 2013. Media Factory published 6 tankōbon volumes between September 27, 2013 and August 27, 2015.

Anime
It was one of five MF Bunko J light novel anime adaptations announced at Media Factory's Summer School Festival event on July 28, 2013. A 12-episode anime television series adaptation by Madhouse aired from January 9, 2014 to March 27, 2014. The opening song is  performed by Yuuka Nanri and ending theme song is "Born To Be" by Nano. On January 3, 2014, Crunchyroll announced that it has obtained the streaming rights for USA, Canada, UK, Ireland, South Africa, Australia, and New Zealand. Sentai Filmworks has licensed the anime for digital and home video release in North America. Kadokawa Entertainment also released the series on Blu-ray on April 18, 2014. Aniplex Japan later released the series alongside World Conquest Zvezda Plot on March 19, 2014.

Episode list

Reception
The anime series has been met with overwhelmingly negative reviews.

Nicoletta Browne of THEM Anime Reviews found several problems with the show, among them being the bland characters, poorly constructed plot, and the cliffhanger ending. She concludes that "the laziness and incompetence on display throughout are just depressing to witness."

Suzuki admitted that it was a mistake to have his light novel adapted into an anime.

References

External links
 
 

2011 Japanese novels
Adventure anime and manga
Anime and manga based on light novels
Fantasy anime and manga
Japanese fantasy novels
Light novels
Madhouse (company)
Novels about magic
Mainichi Broadcasting System original programming
Media Factory manga
MF Bunko J
Muse Communication
Kadokawa Dwango franchises
Romance anime and manga
School life in anime and manga
Sentai Filmworks
Shōjo manga
TBS Television (Japan) original programming